"Holiday for Strings", written by David Rose, is an instrumental composition best known for its use as the theme song for The Red Skelton Show for over 20 years and as the theme for the Brazilian Game Show Pra Ganhar é Só Rodar o Pião da Casa Própria (To win your own house just spin the wheel) aired by SBT. Written in 1942, this piece is still recognized today as a classic American composition. The pizzicato strings and soaring melodies give this composition its distinctive sound.

Spike Jones did a version using humorous instruments including a male impersonating a clucking chicken.

Allan Sherman did a version entitled "Holiday for States" mentioning all the 50 states in the union.
(SOURCE: From the Alan Sherman album "Allan in Wonderland" (1964))

George Wright covered the song in his 1984 album Red Hot and Blue.

The piece starts with an introduction with lush instrumentation in C Major, moving to F minor and back to C Major with the following theme:

After a short transition setting the pace for the next section, it presents the main theme in pizzicato strings in F Major:

After another transition reinforcing the key of C Major, the theme from the introduction reappears in A-Flat Major:

The piece loses steam, and the same theme is transformed with a sentimental swing rhythm and transposed to B-Flat Major.
After a chromatic fanfare modulating back to C Major, the main theme recapitulates in its home key and ends after a short Coda section.

References

1942 songs
Instrumentals
Comedy television theme songs
Compositions for string orchestra
Compositions by David Rose